Fronius International GmbH is an Austrian photovoltaic manufacturer based in Pettenbach, Upper Austria. Fronius is active in the fields of welding technology, photovoltaics and battery charging technology.

History

Formation and development 
In 1945, Günter Fronius (1907-2015) and his wife Friedl set up Fronius International GmbH in Pettenbach. Günter Fronius occupied himself with the development of battery charging systems in an electrical business. A little later, he employed 15 people. In the mid-1960s, the company started to manufacture electronics and welding torches. In 1972, Fronius opened a second site in Thalheim, near Wels, and moved production there. Günter Fronius handed over the management of the business to his two children in 1980, and from then on the company focused more and more on expansion and internationalisation. Sites were opened in Austria and beyond in the years that followed. At the same time, Fronius expanded into the fields of welding technology and battery charging technology. Photovoltaics became a new focus in 1992. In 2001, Fronius opened a factory in Pettenbach, the town in which the company started. The logistics and production site at Sattledt was opened in 2007. With the capture of the American market between 2002 and 2007, the company has now gained a foothold outside Europe.

Today 
Fronius employs more than 5,400 people worldwide in 2020. In addition to the company's headquarter in Pettenbach and other sites in Wels, Thalheim, Sattledt and Steinhaus, Fronius also has a production site in the Czech Republic. Fronius also has 34 subsidiaries.

Business Units

Perfect Welding 
The business unit Perfect Welding provides products and complete systems - both manual and automated - as well as services in welding technology. Around 1950, Fronius launched its first welding transformer with magnet-yoke-control, which allowed the welding current to be continuously adjusted. Fifty years later the company launched the CMT (Cold Metal Transfer) process, which permits the thermal joining of steel to aluminium. The introduction of the DeltaSpot welding system (resistance spot welding system) finally facilitated the mass production of aluminium car bodies.

Solar Energy 
The business unit Solar Energy has been involved in photovoltaics since 1992 and develops and produces high-performance inverters for grid connected photovoltaic systems from 1 kW upwards. The product range is complemented by components for system monitoring, data visualisation and analysis - all available as standalone product add-ons.

Perfect Charging 
Perfect Charging is Fronius International's oldest business unit. Fronius has been researching and developing charging technology since it was founded in 1945. The 1990s saw inverter technology applied for the first time to pulsed charging devices for charging vehicle starter batteries. The ACCTIVA series is a starter-battery charging system. In the field of traction batteries, Fronius offers the SELECTIVA series.

Sites

Austria 

Fronius is based in Pettenbach, where the company was founded. Covering an area of 6,000 m², it is the "centre of excellence" for Fronius welding torches and accounting & internal auditing.  The production and logistics site of the company is located in Sattledt. Since 2007, all battery charging systems, welding systems and solar inverters have been produced here on a site more than 100,000 m² in size. One of the largest photovoltaic systems in Austria, with a module area of 3,600 m², can be found on the roof of the building. There is also a biomass power station that supplies the majority of the energy required.  Thalheim, near Wels, is the Research & Development site of the company and will be extended to cover 22,500 m² by 2011. Special features of the Thalheim site in the future will include photovoltaic electricity generation, geothermal probes (geothermal fields) and the systematic re-use of waste heat from the test laboratories.  Wels, with its historic brick building, is the sales hub of Fronius International. The site, which was opened in 1990, extends over 17,000 m² and is the starting point for the international activities of all three Fronius divisions. The active energy design, photovoltaics system and modern environmental technology ensure that as much energy as possible is collected to meet its own requirements.  The Repair Center International (RCI), which used to be in Sattledt, relocated to Steinhaus in 2010.

International sites 
In addition to the eight sites in Austria, Fronius has 34 international subsidiaries and sales partners/representatives in more than 60 countries (as of 2020).

References

External links 

Manufacturing companies of Austria
Manufacturing companies established in 1945
Energy companies established in 1945
Solar energy in Europe
Photovoltaic inverter manufacturers
Austrian brands
Austrian companies established in 1945